Oz Factor is the second album and major label debut by American punk rock band Unwritten Law, released in 1996 by Epic Records. The songs "Superman" and "Denied" became minor hits on local rock radio stations. 

Unwritten Law supported the album by touring with Bad Religion. It was the band's last album with bassist John Bell, who left the band following the supporting tours.

Production
The band spent about six months writing songs for the album, which was produced by Greg Graffin, of Bad Religion.  Brian Baker, also of Bad Religion, appeared on the album as well. The songs "Suzanne" and "Shallow" are re-recordings of songs from the band's debut album, Blue Room.

Critical reception
The Washington Post thought that "only a few tracks (notably 'Shallow' and 'Tell Me Why') bear a strong resemblance to Bad Religion's high-speed folkie-punk, but everything on Oz has been heard somewhere before." The San Diego Union-Tribune determined that the album "gets its mosh-pit kick from Wade Youman's breakneck drums and John Bell's antsy bass and its pop snap from the band's twisted way with a catchy tune." The Tampa Tribune opined that "the title track boasts blistering rhythm work and loose-limbed downshifts a la NOFX."

AllMusic wrote that the album "sounds like a lighter-weight and much lamer version of Green Day's Dookie, having the same power pop take on skatepunk."

Track listing

Personnel

Band
Scott Russo – lead vocals
Steve Morris – lead guitar, backing vocals
Rob Brewer – rhythm guitar, backing vocals
John Bell – bass guitar
Wade Youman – drums

Additional musicians
Brian Baker – guitar solo on "Suzanne"

Production
Greg Graffin – producer
Paul DuGre – engineer, mixing
Rob Hunter – assistant engineer and mixing
Alex Perialas – additional engineering
George Marino – mastering

Artwork
David Coleman – art direction
Bagel – cover illustration
John Dunne – photography

References

External links
Oz Factor @ discogs.com

Unwritten Law albums
1996 albums
Epic Records albums
Melodic hardcore albums